Raymond Alden may refer to:
 Raymond Macdonald Alden (1873–1924), American scholar and educator
Raymond W. Alden III, American university provost